Minister for Road Safety is a position in the government of Western Australia, currently held by Paul Papalia of the Labor Party. The position was first created in 1965, for the government of Sir David Brand. In 1975, responsibility for road safety was transferred to other ministers. It was recreated in 2008, for the government of Colin Barnett. The minister is responsible for the state government's Road Safety Commission, a standalone government department.

Titles
 16 March 1965 – 3 March 1971: Minister for Traffic
 6 July 1972 – 8 April 1974: Minister for Traffic Safety
 8 April 1974 – 5 June 1975: Minister for Traffic
 23 September 2008 – present: Minister for Road Safety

List of ministers

See also
 Minister for Emergency Services (Western Australia)
 Minister for Police (Western Australia)

References
 David Black (2014), The Western Australian Parliamentary Handbook (Twenty-Third Edition). Perth [W.A.]: Parliament of Western Australia.

Road Safety
Minister for Road Safety
Road safety in Australia
Roads in Western Australia